Mamprusis are an ethnic group in northern Ghana and Togo. Estimates are that there are about 200,000 Mamprusis living in the Northern Regions of Ghana as of 2013, They speak Mampruli, one of the Gur languages. In Ghana, the Mamprusis live mainly in Nalerigu, Gambaga, Walewale, and their surrounding towns and villages in the North East Region. Their origin is in the Upper East Region, principally, Bawku, and they also inhabit parts of the Upper West Region, too.

History 
The Mamprugu Kingdom is the oldest Kingdom, pre dating all others by centuries, in  the territory that would afterwards be named The Gold Coast, and subsequently, Ghana. The Kingdom was founded around the 13th century by the Great Naa Gbanwah/Gbewah at Pusiga, a village 14 kilometres from Bawku, which is why Mamprusis revere Bawku as their ancestral home. Naa Gbanwaah's tomb is in Pusiga.

The Kingdom spans most of the North East, Northern, Upper East and the Upper West Regions of Ghana, portions of Northern Togo, and into Burkina Faso. As a consequence, the King of Mossi, Moronaba, of Burkina Faso, to this day, symbolically, is enskinned by the Nayiri – the king of Mamprugu. Thus, establishing this kingdom as the preeminent of its kind. The only kingdom in present-day Ghana whose relevance and authority cuts across national boundaries on the weight of its humble supremacy.

The name of the kingdom is Mamprugu, the ethnicity is Mamprusi, and the language is Mampruli. Succession to a skin is hereditary. Only male direct descendants of Naa Gbanwaah are eligible.

The story of the Mamprusi monarchy traces its origin to a great warrior named Tohazie. Tohazie, means the Red Hunter. He was called the Red Hunter by his people because he was fair in complexion. Tohazie's grandson Naa Gbanwaah settled in Pusiga and established Mamprugu.

Mamprusi is the eldest of the Mõõre-Gurma (Mole—Dagbamba) ethnic group: Mamprusi, Dagomba, Nanumba, and Moshie.

Rulers

Culture 
Majority of the Mamprusi people are adherents of the Islamic Faith. The Mamprusi began converting to Islam in the 17th century as a result of the influence of Dyula merchants.

Traditional occupations of the Mamprusi include farming and raising livestock.

References

Further reading

External links
 https://www.ghanaweb.com/GhanaHomePage/NewsArchive/Autobiography-of-Alhaji-Mumuni-Bawumia-Launched-66530
 https://live.worldbank.org/experts/mahamudu-bawumia
 http://www.africanbookscollective.com/books/a-life-in-the-political-history-of-ghana

 
Ethnic groups in Ghana
Ethnic groups in Togo